The Gaylord Thompson House, in Lewiston, Idaho, was built in 1904.  It was listed on the National Register of Historic Places in 1992.

It was designed by architect James Nave and includes Colonial Revival style, in particular Dutch Colonial.

References

National Register of Historic Places in Nez Perce County, Idaho
Colonial Revival architecture in Idaho
Dutch colonial architecture
Houses completed in 1904